This is a list of earthquakes in 1946. Only magnitude 6.0 or greater earthquakes appear on the list. Lower magnitude events are included if they have caused death, injury or damage. Events which occurred in remote areas will be excluded from the list as they wouldn't have generated significant media interest. All dates are listed according to UTC time. Several great shocks affected the planet in 1946. The largest was one of the most significant in human terms. The quake itself was a magnitude 8.6 striking on April 1 in Alaska resulting in a tsunami mainly affecting Hawaii. The consequence of this apart from many deaths was the foundation of the Pacific Tsunami Warning Center. This organisation has helped to substantially reduce the death toll of tsunamis in the Pacific, although there have been a few exceptions, including the 2011 Japan event. Japan itself was heavily affected in 1946 by a large quake hitting in December, causing 1,362 deaths. The Dominican Republic was another nation that suffered great destruction in August. Turkey, Peru, and Turkmenistan all saw earthquakes causing many deaths. In general, 1946 was a busy year, with 21 events measuring above 7.0 and three exceeding a magnitude of 8.0.

Overall

By death toll 

 Note: At least 10 casualties

By magnitude 

 Note: At least 7.0 magnitude

Notable events

January

February

March

April

May

June

July

August

September

October

November

December

References

1946
 
1946